{{Speciesbox
| image = 
| image_caption = 
| taxon = Apomyelois cognata
| authority = (Staudinger, 1871)
| synonyms = 
Myelois cognata Staudinger, 1871
Apomyelois schaeuffelella Amsel, 1959
}}Apomyelois cognata is a species of snout moth in the genus Apomyelois. It was described by Staudinger in 1871, originally in genus Myelois. 

Distribution
The species is known to occur in Russia. An old and unconfirmed record exists for Cyprus. Apomyelois schaeuffelella, described in 1959 by Hans Georg Amsel and considered a junior synonym of Apomyelois cognata, was described from Iran.

Description
Adults of the species resemble those of Apomyelois bistriatella, but are larger, have broader forewings of which the markings are more contrasting than in A. bistriatella'', and show some genital differences. The wing pattern and colouring is slightly variable. The wingspan is 20–23 mm.

References

Moths described in 1871
Phycitini
Moths of Europe